The Ausable Club, in St. Huberts, New York, is the name of a club and the clubhouse of the Adirondack Mountain Reserve (AMR), which upon the initiative of William George Neilson, formed in 1887 to save the lands around Beede's Hotel from the lumber industry.  The Reserve once owned most of the Adirondack High Peaks.  The club is also the home of the Adirondack Trail Improvement Society, known as A.T.I.S, which developed and still maintains many of the trails to the high peaks.  The clubhouse property, also known as St. Hubert's Inn, Beede House, or Beede Heights Hotel, is listed on the National Register of Historic Places.

Club members have included Harvard president James Conant, clergyman Henry Sloane Coffin, aeronautical engineer Jerome Hunsaker, painter Harold Weston, American statesman John J. McCloy and US Secretary of War Henry L. Stimson, who blazed a trail up nearby Noonmark Mountain that is still in use.
Certain Easement Trails on AMR/AC lands are open to the public, with restrictions, and provide access to many of the High peaks trails: Basin Mountain, Mount Skylight, Mount Marcy, Mount Haystack, Mount Colvin, Nippletop Mountain, Dial Mountain, Lower Wolfjaw Mountain, Upper Wolfjaw Mountain, Armstrong Mountain, Gothics, Sawteeth, Saddleback Mountain, Noonmark Mountain, Round Mountain, and Rainbow and Beaver Meadow Falls.

History
The present clubhouse sits on the  site of Beede's Hotel, built in 1876.  Beede's was one of the first of the Adirondack hotels to cater to wealthy sportsmen eager to escape city life during the summer, a phenomenon that predated the Civil War, but that was greatly accelerated by advances in transportation offered by steam ships and railroads.  Beede's was notorious for its austere accommodations, but no less famous for its setting near Upper and Lower Ausable Lakes and the Ausable River, and for its views of Giant and Noonmark Mountains, Sawteeth and Mount Colvin.  Guides were available to lead parties up the rocky ravine of the Ausable to lean-to shelters on the lakes, and thence to the high peaks above.

When it became known that the woods around Beede's was going to be timbered by the lumber company which owned them, a prominent Philadelphia mining engineer and summer resident William G. Neilson, secured a two-month option on the property dated September 20, 1886. By December 1, 1886, William Neilson, William Alderson, George Burnham, Charles Hinchman, J.W. Fuller, Richard Dale and Edward Howell successfully raised the down payment to secure a two-year warranty deed which was signed by Neilson and Alderson. By October 1887, twenty-nine stockholders had formed a corporation, the Adirondack Mountain Reserve. Although the Reserve prohibited hunting and camping, the land remained open to the public for hiking.

In 1890, the owners of the Reserve formed the Keene Heights Hotel Company, with a plan to purchase Beede's Hotel, but the building burned to the ground in March.  Philadelphia architectural firm Wilson Brothers & Company was hired to design St. Hubert's Inn, and four months later the new hotel was opened in the present structure.  However, by 1904, the venture proved unprofitable, and was closed.  The following year, the AMR's owners formed the Ausable Club, and purchased the hotel property as a clubhouse.

The clubhouse
The clubhouse is a -story clapboard building with sparing use of Queen Anne details, arranged in two long blocks joined at a 22.5 degree angle where a large 3-story octagonal porch provides sheltered access to the surrounding views.  In addition, a porch runs the full length of the first floor.  Protected by its status on the National Register of Historic Places, the building has suffered remarkably little change, inside or out, since it was built.

References

External links
 Official website
 About, ausableclub.org
Adirondack Journey - Principal Adirondack Trailheads

Environmental organizations based in New York (state)
Hiking organizations in the United States
History of New York (state)
Adirondacks
Clubhouses on the National Register of Historic Places in New York (state)
Queen Anne architecture in New York (state)
Cultural infrastructure completed in 1876
Cultural infrastructure completed in 1890
National Register of Historic Places in Essex County, New York
1890 establishments in New York (state)